South Schraalenburgh Church, also known as South Presbyterian Church, was founded 1723 in Bergenfield, Bergen County, New Jersey, United States, as a Dutch Reformed church, as an alternative place of worship, as the nearest church was located in Hackensack.  The square sanctuary was completed in 1728, with a new sanctuary (still currently in use) completed in 1799.  Opposing elements within the congregation split with the mainstream and founded the North Schraalenburgh Reformed Church in 1801.

In 1913 the church joined the Presbyterian Church, and changed their name to the South Presbyterian Church.

See also 
 National Register of Historic Places listings in Bergen County, New Jersey
 South Church Manse

References

External links
 SouthPresbyterian.net: History

Bergenfield, New Jersey
Churches on the National Register of Historic Places in New Jersey
Churches completed in 1728
Former Dutch Reformed churches in the United States
Former Reformed Church in America churches
18th-century Presbyterian church buildings in the United States
Dutch-American culture in New Jersey
National Register of Historic Places in Bergen County, New Jersey
New Jersey Register of Historic Places
Reformed Church in America churches in New Jersey
1723 establishments in New Jersey